Vitaly Vsevolodovich Mansky (born 2 December 1963 in Lviv, Ukrainian SSR, Soviet Union) is a Russian documentary film director. He is the founder of a festival of documentary movies, ArtDocFest and has resided in Riga since 2014. Artdocfest has since collaborated with the Riga International Film Festival.

Political stance 

In March 2014, Mansky signed an open letter "We are with you!" to support Ukrainian filmmakers.

In 2018, he supported the European Film Academy's appeal in defense of Ukrainian filmmaker Oleg Sentsov, who was imprisoned in Russia.

On December 2020, Mansky went for a solitary manifestation outside the Federal Security Service building at the Lubyanka Square, holding men's underpants. The manifestation took place after the publication of the Alexei Navalny's conversation with his alleged poisoner.

In February 2022, Mansky spoke out against the Russian invasion of Ukraine. In April the same year, he expressed his anti-war views at a rally in Riga.

Following Nikita Mikhalkov's request, the Russian Interior Ministry added Vitaly Mansky on the wanted list in September 2022 for slander.

Selected filmography

 Vladimir & Oksana in Love Country (2022, TV series)
 Gorbachev. Heaven (2020)
 Putin's Witnesses (Свидетели Путина, Putina liecinieki, Svědkové Putinovi) 2018
  (Close Relations) 2016
 Under the Sun (В лучах солнца; V paprscích slunce) 2015
 Pipeline (Tруба; Die Trasse) 2013
 Patria o Muerte / Motherland or Death 2011
 Gagarin's Pioneers (Our Motherland) 2006
 Anatomiya TATU (Anatomy of t.A.T.u.) 2003
 Etyudy O Lyubvi (1994)
 Srezki Ocherednoy Voyny (1993)
 Yevreyskoe Schaste (1991)

References

External links 

 Mansky's personal website 
 

1963 births
Living people
Film people from Lviv
Russian film directors
Russian documentary filmmakers
Gerasimov Institute of Cinematography alumni
Lielais Kristaps Award winners
Russian activists against the 2022 Russian invasion of Ukraine